Paul Holmes (born 18 February 1968) is an English former professional football right back who made more than 400 appearances in the Football League and Premier League. He played for Doncaster Rovers, Torquay United, Birmingham City, Everton and West Bromwich Albion. He is the son of Albert Holmes, who played football for Chesterfield.

Notes

References

1968 births
Living people
English footballers
Association football fullbacks
Doncaster Rovers F.C. players
Torquay United F.C. players
Birmingham City F.C. players
Everton F.C. players
West Bromwich Albion F.C. players
English Football League players
Premier League players